Oligocentris uniformalis is a moth in the family Crambidae. It was described by George Hampson in 1912. It is found in the Sula Islands of Indonesia (type locality "Sula Mangoli").

References

Moths described in 1912
Pyraustinae